Saran Lok Sabha constituency is one of the 40 Lok Sabha (parliamentary) constituencies in Bihar state in eastern India. This constituency came into existence in 2008 as a part of the implementation of delimitation of parliamentary constituencies based on the recommendations of the Delimitation Commission of India constituted in 2002. Before delimitation, it was Chapra (Lok Sabha constituency).

Vidhan Sabha segments
Presently, Saran Lok Sabha constituency comprises the following six Vidhan Sabha (legislative assembly) segments:

Members of Lok Sabha

Election results

General Elections 2019

General Elections 2014

General elections 2009

See also
 Saran district
 List of Constituencies of the Lok Sabha
 Pataliputra (Lok Sabha constituency)

References

Lok Sabha constituencies in Bihar
Politics of Saran district